Ski for Two is the 12th cartoon short in the Woody Woodpecker series. Released theatrically on November 13, 1944, the film was produced by Walter Lantz Productions and distributed by Universal Pictures.

Plot
Woody is sifting through some travel magazines when he spots a tempting ad for the Swiss Chard Lodge. The lodge is situated in Idaho, and offers dining for its guests. Woody is ecstatic, and promptly books a train ticket. After disembarking at the train station at Sunstroke Valley, it becomes apparent that the lodge is still an additional 40 miles, with no adjacent roads or any form of transportation. Woody decides to take matters into his own hands by taking a short cut, skiing and singing his way through the mountains.

Upon Woody's arrival, lodge owner Wally Walrus (Jack Mather) advises that there are no accommodations without a reservation. Woody, of course, did not bother to inquire about such a rule. Drawn by the aroma of the warm food inside the lodge, Woody gains entry by disguising himself as Santa Claus. Wally is so excited at the prospect of Kris Kringle arriving that he quickly adorns the lodge with Christmas decorations. It does not take long, though, for the skeptical walrus to discover that it is, in fact, only October, making Santa's arrival somewhat premature.

Woody manages to stuff his Santa toy sack with food from the lodge, and starts singing and skiing his way down the mountain. However, upon opening the sack, Woody discovers a vengeful Wally Walrus who wrings the little woodpecker's neck in disgust and mocks Woody's trademark laugh.

Voice cast
Ben Hardaway as Woody Woodpecker
Lee Sweetland as Woody Woodpecker (singing voice)
Jack Mather as Wally Walrus

Production notes
The title Ski for Two is a pun on the song title "Tea for Two," featured in the 1925 musical No, No, Nanette.

The song Woody performs while skiing to the Swiss Chard Lodge is called "The Sleigh (a la Russe)" (written in 1926 by Richard Kountz and Ivor Tchervanow). According to Shamus Culhane, the composition was used with the belief that it was in the public domain, later to discover that the copyright was still in effect. Lantz sent $50 to the publishing firm for its use in the film. They sent a letter back stating that they would only accept nothing less than a hundred dollars, an amount that Lantz gladly paid. Lee Sweetland, previously the singing voice for Woody in Barber of Seville, supplied his vocals again for the scene. In one of the surviving dialogue sheets, a noted inscription states "have Sweetland sing Woody’s laugh," which he performs near the end.

References

External links

Ski for Two at the Big Cartoon Database

1944 films
1944 animated films
American Christmas films
American skiing films
Walter Lantz Productions shorts
Woody Woodpecker films
1940s American animated films
Universal Pictures short films
Universal Pictures animated short films
Animated films about animals
Animated films about birds
Films directed by James Culhane